Nether Wyresdale is a civil parish in Lancashire, England. In the 2001 United Kingdom census, it had a population of 613, rising to 655 at the 2011 Census.

History
Along with Over Wyresdale, Nether Wyresdale probably formed part of the manor of Wyresdale in the 12th century. Historically, the village formed part of Garstang Rural District and the ecclesiastical parish of Garstang.

Governance
Nether Wyresdale is in the non-metropolitan district of Wyre, in the parliamentary constituency of Lancaster and Fleetwood and is represented at parliament by Labour MP Cat Smith. Prior to Brexit in 2020 it was part of European Parliament constituency of North West England. The village is in the electoral ward called Wyresdale. This ward has a total population taken at the 2011 census of 2,035.

Geography
It is situated between the River Wyre and Grizedale Brook. It includes the village of Scorton, the hamlet of Street, and part of the village of Dolphinholme.

Church
The parish church of St Peter (located in Scorton) was built 1878–79 to a design by Lancaster architects Paley and Austin. It is a Grade II listed building.

Notable people 

 Richard Jackson (1783–1846), Quaker minister

See also

Listed buildings in Nether Wyresdale

References

Sources

Civil parishes in Lancashire
Geography of the Borough of Wyre